Thomas Gardiner is a retired American soccer player who played professionally in the Major Indoor Soccer League and was a member of the U.S. team at the 1981 FIFA World Youth Championship.

Gardiner graduated from RHAM High School where he was an outstanding soccer player.  A member of the 1977 Connecticut High School championship soccer team, he was a 1979 High School All American.  In 1980, Gardiner played a single season with the Southern Connecticut State University men's soccer team  before leaving the team to concentrate on preparations for the 1981 FIFA World Youth Championship.  Gardiner played all three U.S. games in that tournament.  In the fall of 1981, he signed with the Philadelphia Fever of the Major Indoor Soccer League but tore is medial collateral ligament after playing only one game.  As he recovered from that surgery, he suffered a career ending ankle injury in 1982.

He was inducted into the Connecticut Soccer Hall of Fame in 2008.

References

External links
 MISL stats
 

1962 births
Living people
People from Hebron, Connecticut#
Soccer players from Connecticut
American soccer players
Major Indoor Soccer League (1978–1992) players
Philadelphia Fever (MISL) players
Southern Connecticut Fighting Owls men's soccer players
United States men's under-20 international soccer players
Association football defenders